is a PlayStation 2 (PS2) action-adventure game released in 2003. It was re-released on PlayStation Portable in 2009 in Japan only.

The game is a prequel to Way of the Samurai.

Plot
The game takes place in the late Edo period. The player starts as a starving rōnin who collapsed at the gate of a famous trading island-city called Amahara. Soon thereafter, a little girl shares her riceball with the ronin, giving him (or her, depending on the player's choice) energy. A choice appears, introducing the player to the diverse life of a samurai.

Combat
The combat system from the original Way of the Samurai are carried over, albeit with some changes. Amongst them are the inclusion of "stance-breaker" attacks on nearly every weapon, a simplified guard/parry system, and instant kill techniques.

Enhancements
Dojima from the previous game also makes an appearance, though unrelated to the main plot. Here he still serves as a blacksmith to enhance the player's swords. The stats, however, are simplified:

Attack: Attack strength, determines the amount of damage caused when an opponent is struck with the sword
Defense: Defensive strength, determines the amount of damage suffered when the player is struck by an opponent
Durability: Sword strength, increases the amount of tension the sword can generate before breaking.
Quality: The number of upgrades left that can be performed.

Also, the "Appraise" feature is able to make the swords upgraded more powerful. Their effects include addition to attack, defense, durability, tension resistance, or a combination of the above. These, however, requires certain conditions to be met, such as number of kills. Some special swords are able to be appraised based on their name.

Soundtrack
The original soundtrack of the game was composed by the Japanese composer Noriyuki Asakura, it was released on May 21, 2003. It consists of 26 short songs that are played within the game.

Reception

Way of the Samurai 2 was met with mixed reception upon release, as GameRankings gave it a score of 63.09%, while Metacritic gave it 59 out of 100.

References

External links
Spike page
Acquire page

2003 video games
Action-adventure games
Capcom games
PlayStation 2 games
PlayStation Portable games
Video games about samurai
Video game prequels
Video games developed in Japan
Video games scored by Noriyuki Asakura
Video games set in feudal Japan
Video games with historical settings
Acquire (company) games
Single-player video games